Shah Abdul Hamid Stadium is located by the Gaibandha Koborosthan, Gaibandha, Bangladesh.

See also
Stadiums in Bangladesh
List of cricket grounds in Bangladesh

References

Football venues in Bangladesh